Florencia Soledad "Sole" Jaimes (born 20 January 1989) is an Argentine professional footballer who plays as a striker for Brazilian club CR Flamengo and the Argentina national team.

Club career

Jaimes played for Boca Juniors and River Plate in her home country before moving to Brazil in 2014, with Foz Cataratas. In 2015, after a brief period at São Paulo, she joined Santos.

Initially a backup option, Jaimes became a regular starter in the 2016 season, and impressed with 18 goals in the 2017 Campeonato Brasileiro de Futebol Feminino Série A1, being the top goalscorer of the competition. This led to a move to Chinese side Dalian Quanjian, where she stayed for a year before joining Lyon.

On 11 July 2019, Jaimes returned to Santos on a contract until the end of the year. She then moved back to China for the 2020 campaign with Changchun Zhuoyue.

On 21 May 2021, Jaimes returned to Santos for a third spell after agreeing to a three-month loan deal.

International career
Jaimes represented Argentina at the 2008 FIFA U-20 Women's World Cup. At senior level, she played two Copa América Femenina editions (2014 and 2018), scoring five goals in the latter, and the 2015 Pan American Games.

Career statistics

International

International goals
Scores and results list Argentina's goal tally first

Honours

Club
Boca Juniors
Campeonato de Fútbol Femenino: 2008 Clausura, 2009 Apertura, 2010 Apertura, 2011 Clausura, 2011 Apertura, 2012 Apertura, 2013 Clausura, 2013 Inicial

River Plate
Campeonato de Fútbol Femenino: 2010 Clausura

Santos
Campeonato Brasileiro de Futebol Feminino: 2017

Lyon
UEFA Women's Champions League: 2018–19

References
Notes

Citations

External links
Sole Jaimes at n3sports.com

1989 births
Living people
Sportspeople from Entre Ríos Province
Argentine women's footballers
Women's association football forwards
Boca Juniors (women) footballers
Club Atlético River Plate (women) players
São Paulo FC (women) players
Santos FC (women) players
Dalian Quanjian F.C. players
Olympique Lyonnais Féminin players
Changchun Zhuoyue players
Campeonato Brasileiro de Futebol Feminino Série A1 players
Division 1 Féminine players
Argentina women's youth international footballers
Argentina women's international footballers
2019 FIFA Women's World Cup players
Pan American Games competitors for Argentina
Footballers at the 2015 Pan American Games
South American Games gold medalists for Argentina
South American Games medalists in football
Competitors at the 2014 South American Games
Argentine expatriate women's footballers
Argentine expatriate sportspeople in Brazil
Expatriate women's footballers in Brazil
Argentine expatriate sportspeople in China
Expatriate women's footballers in China
Argentine expatriate sportspeople in France
Expatriate women's footballers in France